Come On Over is the third studio album by Canadian country music singer Shania Twain. It was released on November 4, 1997, by Mercury Records. Produced by Robert John "Mutt" Lange, the album became the best-selling country album, the best selling album by a Canadian and is recognized by Guinness World Records as the biggest-selling studio album by a solo female artist, and the best-selling album in the USA by a solo female artist. It is the ninth all-time best-selling album in the United States, and worldwide. It is also the sixteenth best-selling album in the United Kingdom.

As of 2020, Come On Over has sold more than 40 million copies worldwide, shipped over 20 million copies in the United States, with over 15.7 million copies sold according to Nielsen SoundScan, and another 1.99 million through BMG Music Clubs. The album debuted at No. 1 on the Billboard Top Country Albums chart and stayed there for 50 non-consecutive weeks and is recognized by Guinness World Records as the album with the most weeks at No.1 on the US Top Country Albums chart. It stayed in the top ten for 151 weeks. Ten of the sixteen tracks hit the top 20 of the Hot Country Songs chart, eight of which hit top 10, including three No. 1s. Seven of the tracks also made the Top 50 on the Billboard Hot 100 chart. Twain promoted the album with television performances and interviews. It was further promoted with the successful Come On Over Tour, which visited North America, Oceania and Europe. Out of the album's sixteen tracks, twelve were released as singles, including "Love Gets Me Every Time", "Don't Be Stupid (You Know I Love You)", "You're Still the One", "From This Moment On", "That Don't Impress Me Much" and "Man! I Feel Like a Woman!". The album was also promoted with a succession of music videos for the singles. The fifth single, "When", was the only single from the album to not be released in the United States.

The album was nominated for six awards at the 41st Annual Grammy Awards, including Album of the Year and Best Country Album. "You're Still the One", which peaked on the Billboard Hot 100 at number 2, was nominated for four awards, including Record of the Year, Song of the Year, Best Country Song and Best Female Country Vocal Performance, winning the latter two. The album received a further three nominations at the 42nd Annual Grammy Awards, including Song of the Year for "You've Got a Way", Best Female Country Vocal Performance for "Man! I Feel Like a Woman!" and Best Country Song for "Come On Over", winning the latter two.

History
After releasing and promoting her breakthrough album The Woman in Me, Come On Over saw Twain entirely collaborating with producer and then husband Robert John "Mutt" Lange on a variety of country pop numbers, mostly uptempo. Given much more creative freedom than for its predecessor, Twain and Lange sought to break the conventional country music formula on the album and explore the country pop genre to its fullest extent.

Twain decided not to tour off The Woman in Me partly because she felt she needed more powerful music to do a powerful show. Twain and her husband commenced songwriting material for the album as early as 1994, and often wrote apart to later intertwine their ideas. The recording process was intensive, with Lange dedicating overzealous time and patience to each individual track. Though the singer indicated her sonic preferences, she ultimately ceded all production to Lange. On the international version, Twain and Lange revisited the tracks to strip them of country influences and increase the album's marketability beyond the US and Canada.

The album was a blockbuster success, becoming the biggest-selling studio album of all time by a female artist, the biggest-selling country music album, the biggest-selling album by a Canadian act and the seventh biggest-selling album in music history. Three different versions of the album were released, the original country version, released in 1997, and the revised pop/international versions released in 1998 and 1999. The album was also supported by an extensive world tour by Twain.

Critical reception

The album received generally positive reviews from contemporary music critics. AllMusic praised the album for successfully breaking free of traditional country stereotypes (musical brevity, a blatant honkey-tonk image, etc.), while also praising Twain for crafting an album with just as much pop/rock appeal as country appeal. Meanwhile, Entertainment Weekly praised the album for successfully incorporating a substantial rock influence without losing its country sensibilities.

The album was listed at number 21 in the Rock n' Roll Hall of Fame's Definitive 200. In 2020, Rolling Stone ranked the album at number 300 in their list of the 500 Greatest Albums of All Time.

Commercial performance
Twain topped her own record with the release of Come On Over, beating out her previous diamond-selling album The Woman in Me, as the best-selling country music album ever released. Debuting at number two on the US Billboard 200 with a moderate 172,000 copies (3,000 units behind Mase's Harlem World), the album showed its consistency when it moved another 170,000 copies in its second week (a 1.2% decrease) to stay at number two again behind Barbra Streisand's Higher Ground. The RIAA certified Come on Over gold, platinum and two-times platinum on December 23, 1997. It sold more than 100,000 units in 62 different weeks. The album's best sales week was its 110th week, during which it sold 355,000 units to settle at number 10 during the Christmas week of 1999. The album stayed inside the top ten for 54 weeks, set a record for longest stay in the top twenty of the Billboard 200 of 112 weeks, and in top forty for 127 consecutive weeks. 

Come On Over topped the Billboard Country album chart for a record 50 weeks, finishing second to Garth Brooks' Sevens in 1998, finishing first in 1999, and third in 2000 behind Dixie Chicks' Fly and Faith Hill's Breathe. It sold 1,620,000 copies throughout 1997, while ranking as the third best-selling album of 1998 in the US with 4,873,000 units sold and the fourth best-selling album of 1999 with 5,618,000 units sold. Come On Over was the second best-selling album of the 1990s decade in the US with 12,110,660 units sold according to Nielsen SoundScan, and was certified diamond by the RIAA on April 7, 1999.

Come On Over was the first album to reach both 14 million (in September 2001) and 15 million (in August 2004) in sales in the US since 1991, when Nielsen SoundScan started tracking music sales.  It ranks as the second best-selling album of the Nielsen SoundScan era in the US, with over 15,730,000 copies sold by October 2017, behind its nearest rival, Metallica's 1991 self-titled album (16.1 million as of 2015). However, these figures do not include sales through such entities as BMG Music Club, where Come On Over has sold 1,990,000 copies while Metallica has sold fewer than 298,000 copies.

The album topped the charts for 11 weeks in the UK. The album is one of the highest-selling albums ever in Australia, reaching twenty-five times platinum and spending 19 weeks at number one and 165 weeks in the top 100 (or more than three years). It is still the best-selling album of the 1990s and the best-selling album by a female artist in Australia.

Track listing

Original version

International version
The International version was remixed for a more pop and world feel. The only song that stayed the same on both versions was "Rock This Country!". Some issues of this album adhere to the original track-listing and feature Bryan White on "From This Moment On", while others feature the track as a solo recording.

Revised international version
The album was later re-released after the success of "That Don't Impress Me Much". This 'revised version' included The Right Mix of "From This Moment On", the Notting Hill Remix for "You've Got a Way" and the (UK) Dance Remix for "That Don't Impress Me Much". In most countries this mix is titled the "Dance Mix Edit" but for the UK, Netherlands and Germany it was titled the "UK Dance Mix". The Australian Tour Edition features the same changes but includes a 4:28 edit of the regular Dance Mix of "That Don't Impress Me Much" rather than the shorter UK edit, along with a bonus disc with 6 tracks. It was later reissued as a single disc with 3 of the tracks from the second disc added.

Some Asian versions featured a bonus VCD with three videos and an interview.

In the US, this version of the album was released, titled simply as the "International Version", to coincide with both international success and the fact that the original version of the album had maintained heavy chart success throughout the past two years.

Note: This is the only release of Twain's "When" video commercially.

Tour editions
A limited edition tour edition was released in Australia (also in Japan as "Australian Tour Edition") and Asia which contains a bonus disc with bonus mixes and live tracks. Also included was a list of tour dates.

Personnel 
Musicians

 Shania Twain – vocals, backing vocals (1-4, 6-16)
 John Hobbs – Wurlitzer electric piano (1, 9), organ (10), acoustic piano (14)
 John Barlow Jarvis – acoustic piano (2, 3, 10, 13), Wurlitzer electric piano (4)
 Michael Omartian – acoustic piano (5, 9)
 Arthur Stead – synthesizers (5, 16), acoustic piano (6), organ (6, 7, 9)
 Joey Miskulin – accordion (6, 14)
 Dann Huff – guitar solo (1, 2, 5, 11, 13), electric guitar riffs, rhythm guitar, electric 12-string guitar, wah-wah guitar, guitar textures, talk box, electric sitar, six-string bass
 Brent Mason – electric guitar licks (1-4, 7, 8, 11, 12, 13, 15), guitar solo (3, 7, 12)
 Biff Watson – acoustic guitar, electric guitar, rhythm guitar, nylon string guitar
 Larry Byrom – slide guitar (1, 11)
 Eric Silver – mandolin (6, 7, 10)
 Paul Franklin – pedal steel guitar (1-4, 7, 11, 12, 13, 15), "cosmic steel" (8), steel guitar solo (8)
 Bruce Bouton – pedal steel guitar (8, 10), lap steel guitar (9), steel guitar solo (9, 10)
 John Hughey – pedal steel guitar (5, 6, 14)
 Joe Chemay – electric bass, fretless bass
 Paul Leim – drums
 Stuart Duncan – fiddle
 Rob Hajacos – fiddle (3, 13)
 Larry Franklin – fiddle (4, 6, 8, 11, 15)
 David Hamilton – strings (5), string arrangements (5)
 Carl Marsh – strings (5), string arrangements (5)
 Robert John "Mutt" Lange – backing vocals (1-4, 6-16)
 Bryan White – vocals (5), backing vocals

"Bow Bros." gang fiddles on tracks 1, 3, 4, 8, 11, 13 & 15 (of original version) performed by Rob Hajacos, Joe Spivey, Glen Duncan, and Aubrey Haynie.

Production
 Robert John "Mutt" Lange – producer
 Olle Romo – programming, Pro Tools, sequencing and editing, "that extra Swedish swing", engineer, additional engineer 
 Jay Alvarez – assistant programming
 James Somberg – assistant programming
 Bjorn Thornsrud – pre-production programming
 Jeff Balding – engineer, additional engineer 
 Bob Bullock – additional engineer
 Mike Carroll – additional engineer 
 Rob DeGroff – additional engineer, technical maintenance 
 Brian Tankersley – additional engineer 
 Mark Hagen – assistant engineer 
 Sandy Jenkins – assistant engineer
 Mark Stewart – assistant engineer
 Tim Waters – assistant engineer
 Mike Shipley – mixing (all tracks on original version; tracks 1–3, 5–7, 9, 11–12, 14 and 16 on international version); Olle Romo (tracks 4, 8, 10, 13 and 15 on international version); Mutt Lange (track 13 on revised international version (uncredited); edited by Mike Shipley (uncredited))
 Glenn Meadows – mastering 
 March Tenth, Inc. – art direction 
 George Holz – cover photography, colored photography
 Gus Phillipas – black and white photography

Singles chronology

U.S. country
 "Love Gets Me Every Time"
 "Don't Be Stupid (You Know I Love You)"
 "You're Still the One"
 "From This Moment On"
 "Honey I'm Home"
 "That Don't Impress Me Much"
 "Man! I Feel Like a Woman!"
 "You've Got a Way"
 "Come On Over"
 "Rock This Country!"
 "I'm Holdin' On to Love (To Save My Life)"

U.S. pop/adult contemporary
 "You're Still the One"
 "From This Moment On"
 "That Don't Impress Me Much"
 "You've Got a Way"
 "Man! I Feel Like a Woman!"

Europe and Australia
 "You're Still the One"
"When" (Europe only)
 "From This Moment On"
 "That Don't Impress Me Much"
 "Man! I Feel Like a Woman!"
 "You've Got a Way"
 "Don't Be Stupid (You Know I Love You)"

Music videos
 "Love Gets Me Every Time"
 "Don't Be Stupid (You Know I Love You)"
 "You're Still the One"
 "When"
 "Honey, I'm Home"
 "From This Moment On"
 "That Don't Impress Me Much"
 "Man! I Feel Like a Woman!"
 "You've Got a Way"
 "Come On Over"
 "Rock This Country!"

Charts

Weekly charts

Decade-end charts

All-time charts

Year-end charts

Certifications and sales

Video release

In late 1999, the album's video counterpart, appropriately titled Come On Over: Video Collection, was released in VHS format. With the sole exceptions of "When" (1998), which was released exclusively to the United Kingdom, and "Rock This Country!", which at the time had not been filmed, the collection included all of Twain's music videos released in promotion for the album.

Track listing

Certifications

Release history

See also
 List of best-selling albums
 List of best-selling albums by country
 List of best-selling albums by women
 List of best-selling albums in Australia
 List of best-selling albums in Belgium
 List of best-selling albums in Canada
 List of best-selling albums in Europe
 List of best-selling albums in New Zealand
 List of best-selling albums in the United Kingdom
 List of best-selling albums in the United States
 List of diamond-certified albums in Canada

References

1997 albums
Shania Twain albums
Mercury Nashville albums
Albums produced by Robert John "Mutt" Lange
Canadian Country Music Association Album of the Year albums
Canadian Country Music Association Top Selling Album albums